The 1971 County Championship was the 72nd officially organised running of the County Championship. Surrey won the Championship title by virtue of winning more matches because they had finished level on points with Warwickshire.

Table
10 points for a win
5 points to each side for a tie
5 points to side still batting in a match in which scores finish level
Bonus points awarded in first 85 overs of first innings
Batting: 1 point for each 25 runs above 150
Bowling: 2 point for every 2 wickets taken
No bonus points awarded in a match starting with less than 8 hours' play remaining.
Position determined by points gained. If equal, then decided on most wins.
Each team plays 24 matches.

References

1971 in English cricket
County Championship seasons